Dom Francisco de Melo (1597 – 18 December 1651) was a Portuguese nobleman who served as a Spanish general during the Thirty Years' War.

Biography
Francisco was born in Estremoz, Portugal. From 1632 to 1636 he had been Spanish ambassador to the Republic of Genoa. In 1638 Francisco was appointed viceroy of Sicily, and two years later he was ambassador in Vienna. He was appointed as an understudy of Marquess of Leganés.

Francisco was marquis of the Portuguese Tor de Laguna, count of Assumar, and, from 1641 to 1644, interim governor of the Southern Netherlands. 

When Francisco arrived in the Southern Netherlands, he already had an impressive political career. He scored a victory against Antoine III de Gramont at the Battle of Honnecourt in May 1642. 

Francisco was defeated at the Battle of Rocroi in 1643. In August 1644 Francisco returned to Spain and was appointed to the council of state and royal military adviser by Philip IV of Spain.

Notes

References

Sources

1597 births
People from Estremoz
1651 deaths
Viceroys of Aragon
Governors of the Habsburg Netherlands
Ambassadors of Spain to Austria
Viceroys of Sicily
Portuguese nobility
Spanish generals
Portuguese people of the Thirty Years' War
Military personnel of the Franco-Spanish War (1635–1659)